Koppal is a city in Karnataka, India.

Koppal may also refer to:

 Koppal (Karnataka Assembly constituency), Karnataka
 Koppal (Lok Sabha constituency), Karnataka
 Koppal (Rural), a village in Karnataka
 Koppal district, Karnataka
 K. G. Koppal, a locality in Chamarajapuram, Mysore, Karnataka

See also
 
 Koppa (disambiguation)